

Global
 (Bank of America) Merrill Lynch Global Bond Index
 Bloomberg Barclays Global Aggregate Bond Index
 Citi World Broad Investment-Grade Bond Index (WorldBIG)

Countries

Switzerland
 Swiss Bond Index

Government bonds
 Bloomberg Barclays US Treasury Index
 Barclays Inflation-Linked Euro Government Bond Index
 Citi World Government Bond Index (WGBI)
 FTSE UK Gilts Index Series
 J.P. Morgan Government Bond Index

Most traded government bonds

Emerging market bonds
 J.P. Morgan Emerging Markets Bond Index
 Citi Emerging Markets Broad Bond Index (EMUSDBBI)

High-yield bonds
 (Bank of America) Merrill Lynch High-Yield Master II
 Barclays High-Yield Index
 Bear Stearns High-Yield Index
 Citi US High-Yield Market Index
 (Credit Suisse) First Boston High-Yield II Index
 S&P US Issued High-Yield Corporate Bond Inex

Leveraged loans
 S&P Leveraged Loan Index

Asset-backed securities
 Markit ABX.HE
 Markit IBoxx

See also
Bond market index
List of stock market indices

Lists
List of stock exchanges
List of African stock exchanges
List of American stock exchanges
List of East Asian stock exchanges
List of European stock exchanges
List of South Asian stock exchanges

Bond Market Indices